The Stoa Poikile or Painted Porch, originally called the Porch of Peisianax, was a stoa (a covered walkway or portico) erected during the 5th century BC and was located on the north side of the Ancient Agora of Athens. The Stoa Poikile was one of the most famous sites in ancient Athens, owing its fame to the paintings and loot from wars displayed in it.

Overview
The Stoa was the location from which Zeno of Citium taught Stoicism. The philosophical school of Stoicism takes its name from having first been expounded here, and was derived from the Greek word stoa. Zeno taught and lectured to his followers from this porch.  Excavations carried out by the American School of Classical Studies at Athens over the past two decades have revealed much of the foundations and some lower elements of the stoa on the north side of the Athenian Agora; it had a Doric columnar facade and an Ionic interior colonnade.

The Stoa Poikile was decorated by fresco painter and sculptor Micon of Athens in collaboration with Polygnotos of Thasos; both artists worked around the mid-5th century BC. The paintings were most probably located on the inner wall of the stoa. In the time of Pausanias (2nd century AD), the paintings in the Stoa included:
 The Battle of Oenoe (author unknown)
 Amazonomachy by Micon
 The Taking of Troy by Polygnotus
 The Battle of Marathon by Panaenus (also ascribed to Micon and Polygnotus who may have assisted in the work)

There is a contrast between the mythical and historical events portrayed: depictions of Theseus' victory over the Amazonians and the Fall of Troy are juxtaposed sharply with the portrayal of the historic Battle of Oenoe (conjectured to have occurred in the pentecontaetia at Oenoe, Attica on the Thriasian Plain near Eleutherae), the first important Athenian victory over Sparta, and the Battle of Marathon.

The Stoa Poikile stood in good repair for over six centuries, possibly gaining additional artwork over the centuries.  It suffered when Athens was sacked in 267 AD by Herulians, although only easily looted items were taken at that time.  The paintings were removed by a Roman governor shortly before 396 AD. The Stoa itself probably existed for another 50–100 years until it was demolished to gain building material for a city wall.

Painting of the Battle of Marathon
The Battle of Marathon features most predominantly and as such, displays the confidence and identity of the Athenians in the wake of the Persian Wars.

Of this painting Pausanias says:

References

External links
 
  Stoa Poikile on the page of the Agora Excavations, American School of Classical Studies in Athens

Ancient Greek buildings and structures in Athens
Education in Athens
Stoicism
Battle of Marathon
Ancient Agora of Athens
Stoas in Greece